Sangsari or Sangisari is an Iranian language spoken mainly in the Semnan and Tehran provinces of Iran, especially in the Sangesar (Mahdi Shehr) town and in several surrounding villages. Sangsari is included in the Semnani group of Northwestern Iranian languages that also includes Lasgerdi, Semnani, and Sorkhei.  There are around 50,000 Sangsari speakers.

Glottolog classifies Sangsari under "Komisenian" language family. This designation is also adopted by Wiktionary.

Phonology
The vowels of Sangsari are /a, a:, e, e:, i, o, ö, u, u:/.  The consonants are the same as in Persian.

Pronouns
Sangseri distinguishes two numbers in pronouns—singular and plural—and marks two cases in the singular—the direct (nominative) and the oblique (other cases).  Masculine and feminine forms are distinct in the singular third person pronouns.

Notes

References
Pierre Lecoq. 1989. "Les dialectes caspiens et les dialectes du nord-ouest de l'Iran," Compendium Linguarum Iranicarum.  Ed. Rüdiger Schmitt.  Wiesbaden:  Dr. Ludwig Reichert Verlag.  Pages 296–314.

Northwestern Iranian languages